Johannes Fischbach (born 4 March 1988 in Tirschenreuth) is a German downhill mountain biker.

Titles
Winner of the 2008 German national downhill four-cross championship.
Winner of the 2007 German national downhill four-cross championship.

References

External links
 
 

1988 births
Living people
German male cyclists
German mountain bikers
Downhill mountain bikers
Four-cross mountain bikers
Cyclists from Bavaria
People from Tirschenreuth (district)
Sportspeople from the Upper Palatinate